The chestnut-bellied rock thrush (Monticola rufiventris) is a species of bird in the family Muscicapidae.

It is found in the northern regions of the Indian subcontinent, eastwards towards parts of Southeast Asia.  Its range includes Bangladesh, Bhutan, India, Tibet, Laos, Myanmar, Nepal, Pakistan, Thailand, and Vietnam.

Its natural habitat is temperate forests.

Gallery

References

chestnut-bellied rock thrush
Birds of the Himalayas
Birds of Eastern Himalaya
Birds of South China
chestnut-bellied rock thrush
Taxonomy articles created by Polbot